Sphegina clavata is a species of hoverfly in the family Syrphidae.

Distribution
Slovenia.

References

Eristalinae
Insects described in 1763
Diptera of Europe